The Semarajaya Museum is a museum located in the town of Semarapura in Klungkung Regency on Bali, Indonesia.

References

Literature

External links 
 Museum Semarajaya

Museums in Bali
Klungkung Regency